Nella Walker (March 6, 1886 – March 22, 1971) was an American actress and vaudeville performer of the 1920s through the 1950s.

Biography
The daughter of Mr. and Mrs. Charles Walker, she was born and raised in Chicago. In 1910, she married Wilbur Mack. In 1912, they formed the vaudeville team Mack and Walker. By 1929, she had launched a film acting career, her first film role being in Tanned Legs. She appeared in three films in 1929 and easily transitioned to sound films, appearing in another four films in 1930, possibly making the smooth transition because she was never an established actress in silent films.

In 1931, her film career took off, with appearances in 10 films that year, five of which were uncredited. Her marriage ended not long after her film career was on the rise, and from 1932 to 1933, she appeared in 15 films, only five of which were uncredited. In 1935, her career improved, and from this year to 1938, she had 23 film appearances. Her biggest film appearance during this period was in Young Dr. Kildare with Lionel Barrymore and Lew Ayres. Throughout the 1930s, her career was strong, and despite never being a premier star, she repeatedly had solid acting roles. She finished the decade strongly in 1939 with nine film roles, only three of which were uncredited.

The 1940s mirrored her success of the previous decade in many ways, with appearances in 37 films from 1940 to 1947. Later in her career, and over 60 years of age, she slowed her career for a time, not having another role until 1950 when she appeared in Nancy Goes to Rio with Ann Sothern and Carmen Miranda. She appeared in another two films in 1952, then had her last film acting role in 1954 in the film Sabrina with Humphrey Bogart and Audrey Hepburn.

Last years and death
She appeared in 117 movies, settling in Los Angeles, where she was residing at the time of her death on March 22, 1971, at age 85.

Selected filmography

Chinatown Nights (1929; voice double)
Tanned Legs (1929) - Mrs. Sophie Reynolds
The Vagabond Lover (1929) - Mrs. Whittington Todhunter
Seven Keys to Baldpate (1929) - Mrs. Irene Rhodes
Alias French Gertie (1930) - Morton's Wife
Rain or Shine (1930) - Mrs. Conway
What a Widow! (1930) - Marquise
Extravagance (1930) - Mrs. Kendall
The Hot Heiress (1931) - Mrs. Hunter
Indiscreet (1931) - Mrs. Woodward
Hush Money (1931) - Mrs. Stockton (uncredited)
Their Mad Moment (1931) - Suzanne Stanley
The Common Law (1931) - Yacht Guest (uncredited)
The Public Defender (1931) - Aunt Matilda
An American Tragedy (1931) - Hotel Guest (uncredited)
The Bargain (1931) - The Patroness
Daughter of the Dragon (1931) - Lady Petrie (uncredited)
Susan Lenox (1931) - Dinner Guest (uncredited)
Lady with a Past (1932) - Aunt Emma
As You Desire Me (1932) - Lucia Marco (uncredited)
Is My Face Red? (1932) - Mildred's Aunt Vickie (uncredited)
Down to Earth (1932) - Mrs. Cameron (uncredited)
Trouble in Paradise (1932) - Mme. Bouchet (uncredited)
They Call It Sin (1932) - Mrs. Hollister
20,000 Years in Sing Sing (1932) - Mrs. Long (uncredited)
Frisco Jenny (1932) - Janet Reynolds (uncredited)
Second Hand Wife (1933) - Mrs. Cavendish
Sensation Hunters (1933) - Mrs. Grayson
Dangerously Yours (1933) - Lady Gregory
Humanity (1933) - Mrs. James Pelton
Reunion in Vienna (1933) - Countess Von Stainz
This Day and Age (1933) - Little Fellow's Moll (uncredited)
Ace of Aces (1933) - Mrs. Adams
Ever in My Heart (1933) - Cousin Martha Sewell
The House on 56th Street (1933) - Eleanor Van Tyle
Four Frightened People (1934) - Mrs. Ainger
The Ninth Guest (1934) - Margaret Chisholm
All of Me (1934) - Mrs. Darrow
Fashions of 1934 (1934) - Mrs. Van Tyle
Change of Heart (1934) - Mrs. Frieda Mockby
Madame Du Barry (1934) - Mme. de Noailles
Elmer and Elsie (1934) - Mrs. Eva Kincaid
Desirable (1934) - Eve - aka Madame Françoise (uncredited)
Big Hearted Herbert (1934) - Mrs. Goodrich
Behold My Wife! (1934) - Mrs. Copperwaithe (uncredited)
Fugitive Lady (1934) - Mrs. Brooks
The Right to Live (1935) - Mrs. Pride
Under Pressure (1935) - Aunt Alice Simpson (uncredited)
The Woman in Red (1935) - Aunt Bettina
McFadden's Flats (1935) - Mrs. Hall
A Dog of Flanders (1935) - Frau Vanderkloot
Going Highbrow (1935) - Mrs. Forrester Marsh
Dante's Inferno (1935) - Mrs. Hamilton (uncredited)
Red Salute (1935) - Aunt Betty
I Live My Life (1935) - Ruth's Mother (uncredited)
Coronado (1935) - Mrs. Gloria Marvin
Klondike Annie (1936) - Missionary (uncredited)
Small Town Girl (1936) - Mrs. Dakin
Captain January (1936) - Mrs. John Mason
Don't Turn 'Em Loose (1936) - Helen Webster
Three Smart Girls (1936) - Dorothy Craig
Stella Dallas (1937) - Mrs. Grosvenor
45 Fathers (1937) - Mrs. Carter
The Crime of Doctor Hallet (1938) - Mrs. Carpenter
The Rage of Paris (1938) - Mrs. Duncan
Professor Beware (1938) - Travelers Aid Society Clerk (uncredited)
Young Dr. Kildare (1938) - Mrs. Chanler
Hard to Get (1938) - Mrs. Emmy Atwater (uncredited)
Made for Each Other (1939) - Dr. Langham's Nurse-Receptionist (uncredited)
The Saint Strikes Back (1939) - Mrs. Betty Fernack
Three Smart Girls Grow Up (1939) - Dorothy Craig
In Name Only (1939) - Mrs. Walker
When Tomorrow Comes (1939) - Betty Dumont
These Glamour Girls (1939) - Mrs. Christy - Carol's Mother (uncredited)
Espionage Agent (1939) - Mrs. Peyton (uncredited)
A Child Is Born (1939) - Mrs. Twitchell
Swanee River (1939) - Mrs. McDowell
Irene (1940) - Mrs. Marshall (uncredited)
The Saint Takes Over (1940) - Mrs. Lucy Fernack
I Love You Again (1940) - Kay's Mother
No Time for Comedy (1940) - First-Nighter (uncredited)
Little Men (1940) - Truant Officer (uncredited)
Kitty Foyle (1940) - Aunt Jessica
Blame It on Love (1940) - Virginia Francis
Buck Privates (1941) - Mrs. Parker II
Back Street (1941) - Corinne Saxel
A Girl, a Guy and a Gob (1941) - Mrs. Grange
Repent at Leisure (1941) - Mrs. Sally Baldwin
Reaching for the Sun (1941) - Nurse
Million Dollar Baby (1941) - Mrs. Amory, Jim's Mother (uncredited)
Manpower (1942) - FloorLady (uncredited)
Kathleen (1941) - Mrs. Farrell
Hellzapoppin' (1941) - Mrs. Rand
Kid Glove Killer (1942) - Mrs. Daniels
Sauce for the Gander (1942) - Mrs. Bentley
We Were Dancing (1942) - Mrs. Janet Bentley
Blondie for Victory (1942) - Mrs. Holbrook, Fashion Show Director (uncredited)
Air Raid Wardens (1943) - Millicent Norton
Hers to Hold (1943) - Dorothy Craig
What a Woman! (1943) - Senator's Wife (uncredited)
Ladies of Washington (1944) - Mrs. Crane (uncredited)
Take It or Leave It (1944) - Mrs. Preston (uncredited)
In Society (1944) - Mrs. Van Cleve
Murder in the Blue Room (1944) - Linda Baldrich
A Guy, a Gal and a Pal (1945) - General's Wife (uncredited)
The Clock (1945) - Marriage Clerk (uncredited)
Follow That Woman (1945) - Mrs. Henderson
Two Sisters from Boston (1946) - Mrs. Lawrence Tyburt Patterson Sr.
Big Town (1946) - Mrs. Johannsen, victim's mother
The Locket (1946) - Mrs. Wendell
The Beginning or the End (1947) - Grace Tully
Undercover Maisie (1947) - Mrs. Andrew Lorrison
Variety Girl (1947) - Mrs. Webster
The Unfinished Dance (1947) - Dress Designer (uncredited)
Magic Town (1947) - Grandview Citizen (uncredited)
This Time for Keeps (1947) - Harriet Allenbury (uncredited)
That Hagen Girl (1947) - Molly Freneau
Nancy Goes to Rio (1950) - Mrs. Harrison
Flesh and Fury (1952) - Mrs. Hackett
Young Man with Ideas (1952) - Mrs. Jethrow (uncredited)
Sabrina (1954) - Maude Larrabee (final film role)

References

External links

 
 
 

American silent film actresses
American film actresses
Vaudeville performers
Actresses from Chicago
1886 births
1971 deaths
20th-century American actresses